José Luis Vegar Tebar (born 22 February 1975) is a Spanish retired footballer who played as a midfielder, and a manager.

Club career
Vegar was born in Alicante, Valencian Community. During his extensive professional career, with more than 300 official appearances in the second division, playing 293 games and scoring 29 goals in the league alone, he represented Benidorm CF, Recreativo de Huelva, Albacete Balompié, Polideportivo Ejido, UD Salamanca, Alicante CF, CD Logroñés and SD Huesca.

In the summer of 2010, aged 35, after having again contributed prominently as Huesca retained its second level status – 27 matches, two goals – he signed with FC Jove Español San Vicente, a division four team from San Vicente del Raspeig, moving close to home.

Managerial statistics

References

External links

1975 births
Living people
Footballers from Alicante
Spanish footballers
Association football midfielders
Segunda División players
Segunda División B players
Tercera División players
Alicante CF footballers
Benidorm CF footballers
Recreativo de Huelva players
Albacete Balompié players
Polideportivo Ejido footballers
UD Salamanca players
CD Logroñés footballers
SD Huesca footballers
CD Eldense footballers
Spanish football managers
Segunda División B managers
Hércules CF managers